Vittorio Gelmetti (Milan, April 26, 1926 - Florence, February 4, 1992) was an Italian composer.

Works

Soundtracks
0567 - Appunti per un documentario su Pozzuoli (1987) 
Angelus novus (1987) 
Cento giorni a Palermo (1984)
Bene! Quattro diversi modi di morire in versi: Majakovskij-Blok-Esènin-Pasternak (1977) (TV) 
Non ho tempo (1973) 
...E di Saul e dei sicari sulle vie di Damasco (1973) 
La llamada del vampiro (1972)
La sua giornata di gloria (1969) 
Come ti chiami, amore mio? (1969) 
Il sasso in bocca (1969) 
Sierra Maestra (1969) 
Sotto il segno dello scorpione (1969) 
Hermitage (1968) 
La tana (1967) 
Ricordati di Haron (1966)

External links 

1926 births
1992 deaths
Italian film score composers
Italian male film score composers
20th-century Italian composers
20th-century Italian male musicians